Pseudotylosurus is a genus of needlefishes native to South America.

Species
Two recognized species are in this genus:
 Pseudotylosurus angusticeps (Günther, 1866)
 Pseudotylosurus microps (Günther, 1866)

References

Belonidae